Plagionotus astecus is a species of beetle in the family Cerambycidae, the only species in the genus Plagionotus found in the New World.

References

Clytini